The Telkom SA National Aquatic Championships is a yearly open competition event in South Africa which incorporates all aquatic disciplines under the auspices of Swimming South Africa: swimming, water polo, diving, synchronized swimming and open water swimming. The events are held in major cities across South Africa in April and provide the basis for selection for teams to represent South Africa and compete at the FINA World Championships, All Africa Games, Commonwealth Games and the Olympic Games. Each sport has its own championships, for example the 2022 SA National Swimming Championships, which combined are a given year's Telkom SA National Aquatic Championships.

Editions

2016–2021

2022–2024
The following are the planned Championships for 2022 thru 2024.

2011
In 2011, the open water swimming was held at Marina Martinique, Jeffreys Bay from 17–18 April.

In 2011, the event was held on 11–16 April at Newton Park, Port Elizabeth.

See also 
 Sport in South Africa
 List of swimming competitions

References

External links
Telkom's sponsorship of swimming on their official website

National swimming competitions
National championships in South Africa
Swimming in South Africa